Montanoa is a genus of flowering plants in the tribe Heliantheae, within the family Asteraceae.

They are thought to be named after Luis Josė Montaña (1755-1820), a leading Mexican physician of his time.

 Species

References

Heliantheae
Asteraceae genera